The Florida State Seminoles women's soccer team represents Florida State University (variously Florida State or FSU) in the sport of college soccer. The Seminoles compete in Division I of the National Collegiate Athletics Association (NCAA) and the Atlantic Coast Conference (ACC).

Florida State has made twenty-three NCAA Tournament appearances, advancing to the second round on twenty-two occasions, the third round on twenty occasions, and to the quarterfinals on seventeen occasions. Florida State has gone on to make thirteen appearances in the College Cup, advancing to the final on six occasions, finishing as runner-up in 2007, 2013, and 2020 and champions in 2014, 2018, and 2021. The Seminoles have won the regular season conference title five times and the conference tournament nine times. Florida State has had thirty-two All-American players and two Hermann Trophy winners. Florida State has also had twenty-five players selected in the NWSL College Draft, with ten first-round picks.

The Seminoles are coached by Brian Pensky and play their home games in the Seminole Soccer Complex on the university's Tallahassee, Florida campus.

History

The Florida State Seminoles have one of the top women's soccer programs in the nation. The university added women's soccer as its 17th varsity sport in 1998, and have qualified for the NCAA tournament every year since 2000, appearing in the Women's College Cup tournament twelve times since 2003. In final season rankings, they have been in the top 10 every year since 2005. Florida State finished the 2007, 2013, and 2020 seasons as national runner-up with a second-place finish in the polls. The Seminoles finished first in the polls in 2014, 2018, and 2021, winning the national title. The Seminoles completed their first undefeated regular season in 2020. On March 29, 2022, Mark Krikorian resigned as head coach; Tennessee coach Brian Pensky was subsequently hired as his replacement.

Current roster
.

All-Time record

Soccer was officially recognized by the university as a varsity sport beginning with the 1998 season

Rivalries

College Cup
The Seminoles have appeared in the College Cup a total of thirteen times, the second most appearances of any ACC school and third-most nationally behind UNC and Notre Dame.

Florida State has made six appearances in the National Championship game:

Awards

Hermann Trophy
Mami Yamaguchi - 2007 Winner
Dagný Brynjarsdóttir - 2014 Runner-Up
Jaelin Howell - 2020 & 2021 Winner	
Jenna Nighswonger - 2022 Runner-Up
MAC Player of the Year
Mami Yamaguchi (2007)
Jaelin Howell (2020, 2021)
All-Americans
First Team: Kelly Rowland (2006), India Trotter (2006), Mami Yamaguchi (2007), Amanda DaCosta (2008), Becky Edwards (2008, 2009), Tiffany McCarty (2009), Ines Jaurena (2012), Kassey Kallman (2013), Dagný Brynjarsdóttir (2014), Kristin Grubka (2014), Megan Connolly (2015), Cassie Miller (2016), Deyna Castellanos (2019), Jaelin Howell (2020, 2021), Malia Berkely (2020), Emily Madril (2021), Jenna Nighswonger (2022)
Second Team: India Trotter (2005), Selin Kuralay (2006), Sanna Talonen (2008), Sarah Wagenfuhr (2008), Ines Jaurena (2011), Tiffany McCarty (2011), Dagný Brynjarsdóttir (2013), Kirsten Crowley (2016), Deyna Castellanos (2018), Yujie Zhao (2018, 2021), Emily Madril (2021)
Third Team: Leah Gallegos (2003), Amanda DaCosta (2010), Tori Huster (2011), Tiffany McCarty (2012), Kelsey Wys (2012), Cheyna Williams (2014), Natalia Kuikka (2016, 2018), Yujie Zhao (2020), Cristina Roque (2022), Jody Brown (2022)
Fourth Team: Toni Pressley (2010)
All-ACC Players
First Team: Emma Breeland (2000), Cindy Schofield (2001, 2002), Kristin Boyce (2003), Leah Gallegos (2003), Joy McKenzie (2004), India Trotter (2004, 2005, 2006), Selin Kuralay (2005, 2006), Viola Odebrecht (2005), Katrin Schmidt (2006), Mami Yamaguchi (2007), Amanda DaCosta (2008, 2010), Sanna Talnen (2008), Sarah Wagenfuhr (2008), Becky Edwards (2009), Tiffany McCarty (2009), Toni Pressley (2010), Tori Huster (2010), Ines Jaurena (2011), Kassey Kallman (2012, 2013), Kelsey Wys (2012), Dagný Brynjarsdóttir (2013, 2014), Kristin Grubka (2013, 2014), Megan Connolly (2015), Cheyna Williams (2015), Kirsten Crowley (2016), Deyna Castellanos (2017, 2018), Natalia Kuikka (2017), Yujie Zhao (2018, 2020, 2021), Malia Berkely (2020), Jaelin Howell (2020, 2021), Emily Madril (2021) , Jenna Nighswonger (2022), Jody Brown (2022), Cristina Roque (2022)
Second Team: Melissa Juhl (1996), Amber Tollefson (2001), Kelly Rowland (2004, 2006), Julia Schnugg (2004), Amanda DaCosta (2007, 2009), Becky Edwards (2008), Toni Pressley (2009), Jessica Price (2009), Tori Huster (2010), Ines Jaurena (2010), Kassey Kallman (2010), Kelsey Wys (2010, 2013), Casey Short (2010, 2012), Tiffany McCarty (2012), Dagný Brynjarsdóttir (2012), Megan Campbell (2013, 2015), Jamia Fields (2014), Cassie Miller (2014, 2015, 2016), Kirsten Crowley (2015), Deyna Castellanos (2016), Megan Connolly (2016), Natalia Kuikka (2016, 2018), Jaelin Howell (2018), Emily Madril (2020), Clara Robbins (2020, 2021, 2022), Cristina Roque (2020), Gabby Carle (2021), Beata Olsson (2021) , Onyi Echegini (2022), Leilanni Nesbeth (2022)
Third Team: Isabella Schmidt (2014), Berglind Thorvaldsdottir (2014), Emma Koivisto (2015, 2016), Carson Pickett (2015), Michaela Hahn (2015), Gloriana Villalobos (2017), Malia Berkely (2018), Jenna Nighswonger (2020), Jody Brown (2021), Heather Payne (2022), Beata Olssen (2022)
Freshman Team: Megan Connolly (2015), Kaycie Tillman (2015), Natalia Kuikka (2015), Malia Berkely (2016), Deyna Castellanos (2016), Kristen McFarland (2016), Gloriana Villalobos (2017), Yujie Zhao (2018), Jaelin Howell (2018), Jody Brown (2020), Kaitlyn Zipay (2020), Cristina Roque (2020), Maria Alagoa (2021), Mia Justus (2021), Heather Gilchrist (2022) 
ACC Offensive Player of the Year
Mami Yamaguchi (2007)
Tiffany McCarty (2009)
Dagný Brynjarsdóttir (2014)
ACC Defensive Player of the Year
Kassey Kallman (2013)
Kristin Grubka (2014)
Malia Berkely (2019, 2020)
Emily Madril (2021)
ACC Midfielder of the Year
Jaelin Howell (2020, 2021)
ACC Goalkeeper of the Year
Cristina Roque (2022)
ACC Freshman of the Year
Tiffany McCarty (2008)
Megan Connolly (2015)
Yujie Zhao (2018)
ACC Coach of the Year
Mark Krikorian (2005, 2009, 2012, 2014, 2020)
NCAA College Cup - All Tournament Team
India Trotter (2003, 2005, 2006), Kelly Rowland (2006), Mami Yamaguchi (2007), Amanda DaCosta (2007), Sanna Talonen (2007), Tori Huster (2011), Tiffany McCarty (2012), Jamia Fields (2013, 2014), Kristin Grubka (2013, 2014), Kelsey Wys (2013), Cheyna Williams (2014), Cassie Miller (2014), Isabella Schmid (2014), Dagný Brynjarsdóttir (2014), Megan Connolly (2015), Jaelin Howell (2018), Malia Berkely (2018), Gabby Carle (2018), Dallas Dorosy (2018), Caroline Jeffers (2018), Natalia Kuikka (2018) Jenna Nighswonger (2020), Emily Madril (2020), Yujie Zhao (2020), Clara Robbins (2020)
NSCAA All-Region Honor
Melissa Juhl (1996), Emma Breland (2000), Sarah Crawford (2000), Rachel Watkin (2000), Cindy Schofield (2001, 2002), Amber Tollefson (2001), Leah Gallegos (2003), Katie Beal (2003), Kristin Boyce (2003), Joy McKenzie (2003, 2004), Kelly Rowland (2004, 2005, 2006), Julia Schnugg (2004), India Trotter (2004, 2005, 2006), Viola Odebrecht (2005), Selin Kuralay (2005, 2006), Sarah Wagenfuhr (2005, 2006, 2008), Katrin Schmidt (2006), Mami Yamaguchi (2007), Becky Edwards (2007, 2008, 2009), Amanda DaCosta (2007, 2008, 2009, 2010), Sanna Talonen (2008), Tiffany McCarty (2008, 2009, 2011, 2012), Toni Pressley (2009, 2010), Jessica Price (2009), Tori Huster (2010, 2011), Ines Jaurena (2011, 2012), Dagný Brynjarsdóttir (2012, 2013), Kassey Kallman (2012, 2013, 2014), Casey Short (2012), Kelsey Wys (2012, 2013), Kristin Grubka (2013, 2014), Megan Campbell (2013), Cheyna Williams (2014), Cassie Miller (2014, 2015, 2016), Megan Connolly (2015), Kirsten Crowley (2015, 2016), Michaela Hahn (2015), Natalia Kuikka (2016, 2018), Kaycie Tillman (2016), Deyna Castellanos (2016, 2018, 2019), Yujie Zhao (2018, 2019, 2020, 2021), Jaelin Howell (2018, 2019, 2020, 2021), Malia Berkely (2019, 2020), Emily Madril (2020, 2021), Christina Roque (2020, 2022), Beata Olsson (2021), Jenna Nighswonger (2022), Jody Brown (2022), Clara Robbins (2022)
NSCAA Player of the Year
Mami Yamaguchi (2007)
Dagný Brynjarsdóttir (2014)
Jaelin Howell (2020, 2021)
NSCAA Coach of the Year
Mark Krikorian (2014)
NSCAA Assistant Coach of the Year
Mike Bristol (2014)
Soccer America Women's Player of the Year
Dagný Brynjarsdóttir (2014)
Soccer America Women's Coach of the Year
Mark Krikorian (2006, 2014)
TopDrawer Soccer Freshman of the Year
Megan Connolly (2015)
Yujie Zhao (2018)
TopDrawer Soccer Coach of the Year
Mark Krikorian (2018)

See also
Florida State Seminoles
History of Florida State University
List of Florida State University professional athletes

References

External links

 

 
1995 establishments in Florida
Soccer clubs in Florida
NCAA Division I women's soccer teams
Association football clubs established in 1995